KGGS (1340 AM) is a radio station licensed to serve the community of Garden City, Kansas. The station is owned by Steckline Communications, Inc., and airs a classic hits format.

The station was assigned the KGGS call letters by the Federal Communications Commission on July 2, 2009.

References

External links
Official Website

GGS
Radio stations established in 2012
2012 establishments in Kansas
Classic hits radio stations in the United States
Finney County, Kansas